Dwarka is one of the 182 Legislative Assembly constituencies of Gujarat state in India. It is part of Devbhoomi Dwarka district.

List of segments
The assembly seat represents the segments of  Kalyanpur Taluka and Okhamandal Taluka.

Members of Legislative Assembly
1962 - Haridas Jamnadas Kanani, Indian National Congress
1967 - K G Raichura, Indian National Congress
1972 - Goriya Markhi Jethabhai, Indian National Congress (Indira)
1975 - Goriya Markhi Jethabhai, Indian National Congress (Indira)
1980 - Trivedi Lilaben Gaurishankar, Indian National Congress (Indira)
1985 - Pabari Jamnadas Gokaldas, Independent
1988 - (By-elections) - V R Nathabhai, Indian National Congress
1990 - Pabubha Manek, Independent
1995 - Pabubha Manek, Independent
1998 - Pabubha Manek, Independent
2002 - Pabubha Manek, Indian National Congress
2007 - Pabubha Manek, Bharatiya Janata Party
2012 - Pabubha Manek, Bharatiya Janata Party

Election results

2022

2017

2012

See also
 List of constituencies of the Gujarat Legislative Assembly
 Devbhoomi Dwarka district

References

External links
 

Assembly constituencies of Gujarat
Devbhoomi Dwarka district